Lovísa Björt Henningsdóttir (born 11 October 1995) is an Icelandic basketball player for Haukar of the Úrvalsdeild kvenna. She played college basketball for Marist of the Metro Atlantic Athletic Conference from 2014 to 2019. In 2019, she debuted with the Icelandic national team.

Playing career

Early career
Lovísa came up through the junior programs of Haukar and played her first senior game with the team in the top-tier Úrvalsdeild kvenna in 2009. She spent the 2011-2012 season in the Efterskolen Ved Nyborg basketball academy in Denmark. After her return, Lovísa appeared in 15 games during the 2012-2013 season, averaging 3.0 points. In 2013-2014, she appeared in a career high 33 games, averaging 5.6 points and 3.2 rebounds per game. On 22 February 2014, she won the Icelandic Cup after Haukar defeated Snæfell in the Cup finals.

High school career
Lovísa attended The Rock of Gainesville high school in Gainesville, Florida for the 2014-2015 season, where she averaged 17.8 points, 8.1 rebound, 3.1 blocks and 2.6 steals per game.

College career
Lovísa joined Marist College in 2015. In 29 games during her freshman season, she started four for the Red Foxes averaging 9.2 minutes per game and 2.2 points per game.

On 17 December 2016, she scored 21 points, including 6 three pointers, in a 66-61 victory against. For the 2016-2017 season, she started all 32 games for the Red Foxes, averaging 27.7 minutes per game, 8.9 points per game, and 4.9 rebounds per game. In April 2017, she underwent a hip surgery which forced her to miss the upcoming training camp for the Icelandic women's national basketball team. During her senior season, Lovísa appeared in 33 games, averaging 7.6 points per game.

Return to Iceland
After the college season finished, Lovísa signed a 1-year contract with Haukar for the 2019-20 season. For the season she averaged 11.9 points and 6.6 rebounds. In May 2020, she renewed her contract for the 2020–21 season.

On 18 September 2021, Lovísa won the Icelandic Cup with Haukar after a 94–89 victory against Fjölnir in the Cup finals. On 19 March 2022, she won the Icelandic Cup again after Haukar defeated Breiðablik in the 2022 Cup Finals.

On 14 January 2023, she scored 3 points in Haukar's 94–66 win against Keflavík in the Icelandic Cup final. On 30 March 2023, she scored a season high 31 points in a victory against Breiðablik. In the Úrvalsdeild, she averaged 12.3 points and 4.5 rebounds during the regular season and 7.9 points and 3.9 rebounds during the playoffs, helping Haukar to the Úrvalsdeild Finals where they lost 2–3 to Njarðvík.

Lovísa missed the beginning of the 2022–23 season with a shoulder injury, making her season debut on 28 December 2022.

National team career
Lovísa played 27 games for the Icelandic junior national teams from 2010 to 2015. On 14 November 2019, she played her first senior game for the Icelandic national team when it faced Bulgaria in the EuroBasket Women 2021 qualification.

Personal life
Lovísa is the daughter of former basketball player Henning Henningsson who played 30 games for the Icelandic men's national team from 1985 to 1993.  Her brother is basketball player Hilmar Smári Henningsson.

Career statistics

Marist College

Source

References

External links
Marist profile at goredfoxes.com
Icelandic statistics at kki.is

1995 births
Living people
Haukar women's basketball players
Marist Red Foxes women's basketball players
Úrvalsdeild kvenna basketball players